Peruvoside (or cannogenin thevetoside) is a cardiac glycoside for heart failure.

It is derived from Cascabela thevetia (Thevetia neriifolia).

References 

Cardenolides
Alcohols
Aldehydes